This is a list of lighthouses in Eritrea.

See also
List of lighthouses in Sudan (to the north-west)
List of lighthouses in Djibouti (to the south-east)
 Lists of lighthouses and lightvessels

References

External links

Eritrea
Lighthouses
Lighthouses